Red Knight is a brand of Indian whisky, manufactured by Khoday India Limited (KIL), and launched in 1967. The whisky is manufactured at the company's Bangalore facility. Red Knight was initially available only in North India. It was introduced in South India on 23 November 2007.

Red Knight sold an average of 70,000 cases monthly in 2005. Khoday began exporting Red Knight to Italy in October 2007, and Canada in 2008.

References

External links
 Khodays India Limited official site
 Khoday Group official site

Indian whisky
Products introduced in 1967
Alcoholic drink brands